Radzicz  is a settlement in the administrative district of Gmina Dębno, within Myślibórz County, West Pomeranian Voivodeship, in north-western Poland.

The settlement has a population of 8.

History
The area became part of the emerging Polish state in the 10th century. Following Poland's fragmentation, it formed part of the Duchy of Greater Poland. Later on, it was also ruled by Brandenburg, Bohemia (Czechia), the Teutonic Order, Prussia and Germany. Following Germany's defeat in World War II in 1945, the area became again part of Poland.

References

Radzicz